King Manor, also known as the Rufus King House, is a historic house at 150th Street and Jamaica Avenue in Jamaica, Queens, New York City.  It was the home of Founding Father Rufus King, a signatory of the United States Constitution, New York state senator, and ambassador to Great Britain immediately after the American Revolution. Descendants of King's family lived in the house until 1896 when Rufus' granddaughter Cornelia King died and the house was sold to the Village of Jamaica. When the western half of Queens, including Jamaica, became part of the City of Greater New York, the house and the property were turned over to the New York City Parks Department which redesignated the land as Rufus King Park.

It was declared a National Historic Landmark in 1974.

History
The original section of King Manor is believed to date to about 1700 and served as an inn and a farmhouse. Before the King family moved in the Manor also functioned as the parsonage for two ministers of Grace Episcopal Church. Reverend Thomas Poyer lived in the house from 1710 to 1732 and when he died Reverend Thomas Colgan purchased it from his widow. Colgan lived in the house from 1732 to 1755. While Reverend Poyer owned the house Reverend Horatio O’ Ladd described the house as having eight rooms on one floor and two good rooms upstairs. The house would pass to his son-in-law Christopher Smith in 1776 following Mrs. Colgan's death on April 17, 1776.

Rufus King then purchased the house from Christopher Smith on November 20, 1805; King also purchased farm and woodland, averaging a total of 90 acres for $12,000. Ever since King acquired this home, he enlarged the rooms and added to the house to be suitable for entertaining notables of that time as a country house. King made several other renovations to the house including adding on to the eastern part of the house the oval ended dining room that still exists today. He also moved the original cottage behind this section to create the kitchen. King lived in this manor until 1825, when he was stricken with an illness; this forced him to return to Manhattan to be cared for by his youngest son, Frederick, who was a physician. King died in 1827 and was buried beside his wife in Grace Churchyard, Jamaica. This manor was inherited by King's eldest son, John Alsop King, in 1827. Cornelia King, the youngest daughter of John A. King, was the last King family member to live in King Manor.

Preservation
In 1897, the house and ground were bought by the Village of Jamaica to be used as a park, and later a city park.

The King Manor Association was formed in 1900 with the purpose of caring for the house and the museum collection. The Association still exists and runs King Manor to this day.

There are several instances in its history where King Manor as a museum was threatened. The first came in the 1920 when there was talk of turning the house into a branch of the Queens Public Library. Public outcry was so great however, that the plan was abandoned. Then only ten years later there were plans to build a civic center or courthouse on the property directly behind the house in what is today Rufus King Park. Again, there was a lot of push back from the community and a prominent local attorney sent a letter to Mayor Fiorello La Guardia voicing these sentiments. Ultimately, it was Jamaica's lack of parking that saved the park and house.

An Open House was held at King Manor in March 1948 as part of the citywide celebration of the city's 50th anniversary. On Monday and Wednesday during that time, classes from Queens schools and adult leaders were welcomed. Adults were invited on Tuesday and Thursday, and both children and adults were admitted on Saturday. All efforts and tasks to furnish these rooms were done by the Long Island Society of the Daughters of the Revolution, the Colonial Daughters, the Jamaica Village Society and others.

According to an article, the house was supposedly "on the way to the century mark." It is not completely known whether the "manor house" looked the same as it was in 1805 in today's era. Today, the house is picturesque and stands in the center of a square block of King Park on Jamaica Avenue. Only a few people know or care that the King Manor is a "treasure-trove of 18th century lore" and contains furniture, furnishings, books, and pictures that date back to the 18th century. The park and the house are kept painted and repaired by the City of New York. The King Manor Association, formed in 1900, strove to "foster patriotism and good citizenship" by caring for the manor and collecting historical items there.

During its history as a museum King Manor suffered two fires. The first was in March 1964. While the building was saved there was severe structural damage done and many antiques were lost. Two rooms were gutted by the fire with smoke and water damage throughout the house. The damage from this fire was well documented by the Long Island Daily Press. The second fire was minor in comparison and was set on the porch by a group of teenagers. This time the house was saved by a park employee and a very conveniently located fire engine.

Although it is owned by the City of New York, King Manor is maintained by the parks department and its interior furnishings are supervised by volunteers of the King Manor Association of Long Island, Inc. Restoration of the Manor was completed in the spring of 1965 and was open then.

Bicentennial celebration

In March 1987, the City of Queens celebrated the Constitution's bicentennial Tuesday with a parade of children and when city officials marked the 232nd birthday of Rufus King, a Founding Father. The city inaugurated a $1.4 million project to restore King's 18th Century Manor home. Mayor Edward I. Koch described this project as a "birthday present to Rufus King." The parade went 3 blocks from King Manor to the Grace Episcopal Church, where King is buried.

Interior
The manor contains a library with three built-in floor to ceiling bookcases. The shelves hold books and senate records that belonged to John Alsop King and other such books. There is also an old leather horse-hair sofa under the west window that belonged to Rufus King.

Gallery

References

External links

King Manor Museum and Park - NYC Parks and Recreation

Houses on the National Register of Historic Places in Queens, New York
National Historic Landmarks in New York City
Historic American Buildings Survey in New York (state)
Houses completed in 1806
New York City Designated Landmarks in Queens, New York
Biographical museums in New York (state)
Museums in Queens, New York
Historic house museums in New York City
Jamaica, Queens
New York City interior landmarks
Homes of United States Founding Fathers